Hoppe or Hoppé is a German surname that may refer to:

Art Hoppe (1925–2000), columnist for the San Francisco Chronicle
Bettina Hoppe (born 21 May 1974), German actress.
Carl Hoppe (1897–1981), painter
David Heinrich Hoppe (1760–1846), German botanist
E. O. Hoppé (1878–1972), German-born British portrait, landscape and travel photographer
Else Hoppe, Czech figure skater
Erik Hoppe (1896–1968), Danish painter
Felicitas Hoppe (born 1960), German writer
Felix Hoppe-Seyler (1825–1895), German physiologist and chemist
Gunnar Hoppe (1914–2005), Swedish Quaternary geologist and geographer
Hans-Hermann Hoppe (born 1949), economics professor
Hans-Joachim Hoppe (born 1945), German expert on Russian and East European affairs
Jenny Hoppe (1870–1934), German-Belgian painter
Johannes Hoppe (born 1907), German astronomer
3499 Hoppe, a main-belt asteroid named after Johannes Hoppe
Kelly Hoppe, Canadian musician
Marianne Hoppe (1909–2002), German actress
Matthew Hoppe (born 2001), American footballer
Matthias Hoppe (born 1958), East German canoer
Michael Hoppé, UK composer and recording artist
Oscar Hoppe (1886–1936), figure skater
Paul-Werner Hoppe (1910–1974), German SS-Obersturmbannführer (lieutenant colonel) and commandant of Stutthof concentration camp
Reinhold Hoppe (1816–1900), German mathematician
René Hoppe (born 1976), German bobsledder
Rolf Hoppe (1930–2018), German film and stage actor
Rudolf Hoppe (1922–2014), German chemist
Sean Hoppe (born 1971), New Zealand rugby league player
Willie Hoppe (1887–1959), American professional carom billiards champion
Walter Hoppe (1917–1986), German biophysicist and electron microscopist; pioneer in 3D reconstruction
Wolfgang Hoppe (born 1957), East German bobsledder

German-language surnames